

329001–329100 

|-bgcolor=#f2f2f2
| colspan=4 align=center | 
|}

329101–329200 

|-bgcolor=#f2f2f2
| colspan=4 align=center | 
|}

329201–329300 

|-bgcolor=#f2f2f2
| colspan=4 align=center | 
|}

329301–329400 

|-bgcolor=#f2f2f2
| colspan=4 align=center | 
|}

329401–329500 

|-bgcolor=#f2f2f2
| colspan=4 align=center | 
|}

329501–329600 

|-bgcolor=#f2f2f2
| colspan=4 align=center | 
|}

329601–329700 

|-bgcolor=#f2f2f2
| colspan=4 align=center | 
|}

329701–329800 

|-bgcolor=#f2f2f2
| colspan=4 align=center | 
|}

329801–329900 

|-bgcolor=#f2f2f2
| colspan=4 align=center | 
|}

329901–330000 

|-id=935
| 329935 Prévôt ||  || Jean Prévôt (1585–1631), Swiss physician and professor in Italy at the University of Padua. Prévôt was born in Delémont, Switzerland, like the discoverer Michel Ory. || 
|}

References 

330001-331000